is a Japanese manga artist and character designer, best known for manga Ultimate Teacher, Elf-17 and Saber Cats, along with video game series Metal Max.

References 

Manga artists
Video game artists
1959 births
Living people